Divini Redemptoris (Latin for the promise of a Divine Redeemer) is an anti-communist encyclical issued by Pope Pius XI.  It was published on 19 March 1937. In this encyclical, the pope sets out to "expose once more in a brief synthesis the principles of atheistic Communism as they are manifested chiefly in Bolshevism".

Mariano Cordovani O.P. (February 25, 1883 – April 4, 1950) professor of dogmatic theology at the College of Saint Thomas, the future Pontifical University of Saint Thomas Aquinas, Angelicum from 1912 to 1921 and Master of the Sacred Palace under Pope Pius XI contributed especially to the encyclical and afterward published his Appunti sul comunismo moderno treating the Church's position on communism.

Description
The encyclical describes communism as "a system full of errors and sophisms" that "subverts the social order, because it means the destruction of its foundations" as well as removing women from their rightful place in the home.

Pius XI goes on to contrast Communism with the civitas humana (ideal human civilization), which is marked by love, respect for human dignity, economic justice, and the rights of workers.  He faults industrialists and employers who do not adequately support their workers for creating a climate of discontent in which people are tempted to embrace Communism.  He refers to two earlier papal writings on this topic, Rerum novarum and Quadragesimo anno.

The work expresses concern at the growth of communism in the Soviet Union, Spain, and Mexico, and it condemns the Western press for its apparent "conspiracy of silence" in failing to cover such events in those countries. It was published five days after the publication of the more controversial Mit brennender Sorge encyclical, which condemned the German Nazi regime and ideology.

Notes

References

External links 
 Divini Redemptoris, complete English text of the encyclical on Vatican.va

Papal encyclicals
Documents of Pope Pius XI
Anti-communism
1937 documents
1937 in Christianity
Holy See–Soviet Union relations
March 1937 events